Pomak language (pomakiki glosa or πομακικά, pomakika; , pomaški ezik) is a term used in Greece and Turkey to refer to some of the Rup dialects of the Bulgarian language spoken by the Pomaks of Western Thrace in Greece and Eastern Thrace in Turkey. These dialects are native also in Bulgaria, and are classified as part of the Smolyan subdialect. Not all Pomaks speak this dialect as their mother language.

History 
Some grammatical forms of the Rup dialects, published by the Danish linguist Holger Pedersen in 1907, have a striking resemblance to the grammatical forms of the Armenian language. As well, the Rup dialects have slightly different forms of demonstrative suffixes (exercising also functions of the possessive pronouns) from the Bulgarian Tran dialect and the modern standard Macedonian language. 
There are publications concerning the vocabulary of the Rup dialects and anthroponyms of Armenian origin which overlap areas, populated by Paulicians from the 15th to 18th centuries.

According to the 1935 census in Turkey, 3881 people in Eastern Thrace identified their mother tongue as Bulgarian and 18,382 as Pomak. The overall statistic from 1935 shows that 41,041 people spoke Pomak as their mother tongue or as a secondary dialect.

Examples 

Some phrases and words 

Some words and phrases in the Pomak language are borrowed from Turkish, Greek, and other languages.

Grammar

Spatio-pragmatic and temporal-modal uses of nominals and noun modifiers

Three deictics (-s-, -t- and -n-) are used for spatio-pragmatic and temporal-modal reference in nominals. These deictics are used among others in noun modifiers such as definite articles and demonstratives:

References

Further reading 
 Стойков, Ст. Българска диалектология. София, 1968. (Stoykov St. Bulgarian Dialectology. Sofia, 1968). 
Милетич, Л. Ловчанските помаци. София, Български преглед, г. V, кн. I, 1898, c. 67–78. (Miletic, L. The Lovech Pomaks. Sofia, Bulgarian Review, y. V, vol. I, 1898, p. 67-78). 
Савов, В. Ловчанските помаци и техния говор. Известия на семинара по славянска филология. София, 1931, кн. VII, с. 1–34. (Savov, V. The Lovech Pomaks and their language. Proceedings of the Workshop on Slavic Studies. Sofia, 1931, vol. VII, p. 1–34).
Миков, В. Българските мохамедани в Тетевенско, Луковитско и Белослатинско. Родина, 1940 - 1941, No 3, с. 51–68. (Mikov, V. Bulgarian Muslims in Teteven, Lukovit, and Byala Slatina Country. Rodina, 1940–1941, No 3, p. 51–68).
Български диалектен атлас. София, 1980, т. IV: с. Галата /под No 1471/, с. Добревци /под No 1458/ и с. Кирчево (Помашка Лешница) /под No 2306/. (Bulgarian Dialect Atlas. Sofia, 1980, section IV: the village of Galata –under No 1471, Dobrevtsi /under No 1458/, and Kirchevo (Pomak Leshnitsa) /under No 2306/).

External links 
 Report on the Pomak language by the Greek Helsinki Committee
 Стойков, Ст. Българска диалектология, с. 119, 120. (Stoykov St. Bulgarian Dialectology, p. 119, 120).

Pomaks
Dialects of the Bulgarian language
Languages of Greece
Languages of Turkey
Language naming